John Reginald Beardall (February 7, 1887 – January 4, 1967) was a rear admiral in the United States Navy. He was Superintendent of the United States Naval Academy in Annapolis, Maryland from January 31, 1942 to August 16, 1945. He was a 1908 graduate of the Naval Academy and Aide to the Secretary of the Navy, from 1936 to 1939.

Decorations

References

1887 births
1967 deaths
United States Navy personnel of World War I
Burials at Arlington National Cemetery
Military personnel from Florida
Naval War College alumni
People from Sanford, Florida
Superintendents of the United States Naval Academy
United States Naval Academy alumni
United States Navy World War II admirals
United States Navy admirals
Recipients of the Legion of Merit
Recipients of the Navy and Marine Corps Medal
Officiers of the Légion d'honneur
Recipients of the Order of the Sun of Peru
20th-century American academics